KRHV (93.3 FM) is a radio station broadcasting a variety and classic rock format. Licensed to Big Pine, California, United States, the station is currently owned by David A. and Maryann M. Digerness and features programming from Westwood One.

The station is an affiliate of the syndicated Pink Floyd program "Floydian Slip."

References

External links

RHV
Classic rock radio stations in the United States
Radio stations established in 1999
1999 establishments in California